, subtitled  ("In search of the lost future" in French), sometimes abbreviated as , is a Japanese adult visual novel developed by Trumple and released for Windows on November 26, 2010. The title is derived from In Search of Lost Time, a French novel written by Marcel Proust. There have been two manga adaptations published by Kadokawa Shoten and Media Factory. A 12-episode anime adaptation, produced by Feel and directed by Naoto Hosoda, aired in Japan between October and December 2014.

Gameplay

In Search of the Lost Future is a romance visual novel in which the player assumes the role of Sō Akiyama. Much of its gameplay is spent on reading the story's narrative and dialogue. The text in the game is accompanied by character sprites, which represent who Sō is talking to, over background art. Throughout the game, the player encounters CG artwork at certain points in the story, which take the place of the background art and character sprites. In Search of the Lost Future follows a branching plot line with multiple endings, and depending on the decisions that the player makes during the game, the plot will progress in a specific direction.

There are four main plot lines that the player will have the chance to experience, one for each heroine. Throughout gameplay, the player is given multiple options to choose from, and text progression pauses at these points until a choice is made. Some decisions can lead the game to end prematurely, which offer an alternative ending to the plot. To view all plot lines in their entirety, the player will have to replay the game multiple times and choose different choices to further the plot to an alternate direction. Throughout gameplay, there are scenes with sexual CGs depicting Sō and a given heroine having sex.

Plot
Before they move to the new building, the school will hold one last General Club Festival at the old building before it is closed down. Each of the clubs decide to give it their all to make it a success. The student executive committee asks the renowned Astronomy Club to calm the uneasiness among the students in regard to mysterious incidents at the old building. Sō Akiyama, a member of the Astronomy Club, inspects the central of a three-dimensional quake and stumbles upon a quiet girl, Yui Furukawa, who appears to know Sō, and transfers late into the school year, the gears of fate slowly begin to move.

Characters

Main characters
The six main characters are students in the Astronomy Club at Uchihama Academy.

 (anime), Yurika Aizawa (7 years old)
He is a second-year student in class B and a member of the Astronomy Club at Uchihama Academy. Both his father and mother are scientists and are authorities on mechanical engineering. He lives in his childhood friend's house as his parents work overseas. He is interested in astronomy, and plans build a planetarium for the school festival. Due to Kaori's fate, he is strongly motivated in studying medical treatment and Quantum Turing, hoping to achieve a brighter future. In the anime, Sō chooses Yui over Kaori.

 (game), Hatsumi Takada (anime)
Sō's childhood friend. She is a second-year student in class B. She is Sō's classmate and the vice-president of the Astronomy Club. She is kindhearted and is good at cooking. She lives with her mother and Sō in a house; Sō's room is in a building detached from the main house. Kaori is in love with Sō and later confesses her feelings to him. At the beginning of the series, Kaori gets hit by a bus and falls into a coma. This prompts Sō to study science and medicine in order to save her. As Kaori was saved in the past, she wakes up from her coma in the present time where Sō was finally able to return her feelings.

 (game), Akane Tomonaga (anime)
A first-year student in class A and primary heroine who has transferred into Uchihama Academy recently. She joins in the Astronomy Club after she meets Sō. Yui is an artificial intelligence created from an AI Unit research project, sent into the past (October 1) multiple times by Sō to save Kaori from an impending accident at the beginning of the series. She falls in love with future Sō and manages to confess her feelings to past Sō before disappearing after successfully saving Kaori. This gives Sō a new purpose to recreate Yui shown in the epilogue.

 (game), Kei Mizusawa (anime)
Kaori's close friend. She is a second-year student in class A and is the president of the Astronomy Club. She is wise and plays a leading part in the club. She learns aikido and is much stronger than Sō. She mainly uses kicks while fighting against others. In the future, she becomes an assistant scientist for Sō. She has feelings for Sō but hides it knowing that Kaori loves him.

A third-year student in class C and is a member of the astronomy club. She comes from a good family, where her father expects great things from her. She is clever, but is a bit mean. She often reads a book in the clubroom, and possess a mysterious black box related to Yui's essence. In the future, Nagisa constructs the Hanamiya General Research Laboratory to pursue her goal and provide hope. Nagisa's great-grandmother, who was a War Plant researcher, founded Uchihama Academy after she met Yui through a time-loop via the black box.

A second-year student in class C. He is a member of the Astronomy Club and is Sō's close friend. He is an exchange student from the United States. He is not that wise, but is very kind to his friends. He has a stout girlfriend named Jennifer, who lives in the U.S. His name is written as "Osafune Kenny Eitarou" in the game's opening movie. In the future, he delivered the theory on possible time-traveling to Sō.

Other characters

 (game), Hayato Nakata (anime)
A third-year student in class C and is the president of the student council executive. His real name is unknown. He puts the Astronomy Club in charge of maintaining calmness among the school until the festival.

 (game), Mia Naruse (anime)
A second-year student in class B who wears glasses. She is the vice-president of the student council executive, and is a classmate of Sō and Kaori.

 (game), Akio Ōtsuka (anime)
An elderly steward to the Hanamiya family and is Nagisa's bodyguard. He has some experience in Mongolian wrestling.

 (game), Kenichi Ogata (anime)
An old teacher at Uchihama Academy. He is the adviser at the Astronomy Club and is the school library's manager. He seldom turns up at the club.

 (game), Yūko Gotō (anime)
Kaori's mother and is a researcher at the National Institute of Science. Her husband is also a researcher and works with Sō's parents. She immersed herself in studying the human brain.

 (game), Atsumi Tanezaki (anime)
A third-year student in class C and a classmate of Nagisa. She is in the Literary Club at Uchihama Academy. She encounters a ghost in the school and tells the Astronomy Club's members about that experience. She is shy and is out of luck by nature.

 (game), Takuo Kawamura (anime)
The president of the Judo Club at Uchihama Academy. His real name is unknown. He is very rough and lacks flexibility. In the original universe, he shoves Kaori during a confrontation, injuring her leg. During the General festival, the Judo and Karate Club have a friendly match.

 (anime)
A first-year student and a classmate of Yui. She becomes friends with Yui as she sits next to Yui in the classroom. She is an idol and often appears in television. She is an original character for the anime television series.

Development and release
In Search of the Lost Future is the sole title developed by the visual novel studio Trumple. Originally, the design team were developing the game under the visual novel developer Abhar, but following Abhar's dissolution, the team working on the game formed the studio Trumple. The game's scenario was written by three people: Ryo Ohta, Kenji Saitō, and Masaki Sawa. Character design and art direction for the game was split between three artists: Kurehito Misaki, who drew Kaori Sasaki, Airi Hasekura, Shiori Sasaki, and designs for male characters; Shinobu Kuroya, who drew Yui Furukawa, Nagisa Hanamiya, and the designs for the female characters (not including those drawn by Misaki); and Mia Naruse, who provided super deformed illustrations. The game's music was solely composed by Fūga Hatori. In Search of the Lost Future was released on November 26, 2010 as a limited edition version, playable as a DVD on a Windows PC. The regular edition of In Search of the Lost Future was released on February 25, 2011. After the game's release, Trumple announced the suspension of their activity on July 27, 2012.

Related media

Print media
A manga adaptation illustrated by Sasayuki was serialized in Kadokawa Shoten's Comp Ace magazine between the November 2011 and October 2012 issues. Two tankōbon volumes were released: the first on February 23, 2012 and the second on November 17, 2012. A second manga, illustrated by Takeshi Kagura, began serialization in Media Factory's Monthly Comic Alive magazine with the December 2014 issue sold on October 27, 2014. Enterbrain published a 128-page guidebook for the game titled Ushinawareta Mirai o Motomete Visual Fanbook on May 27, 2011.

Anime
A 12-episode anime television series adaptation, produced by Feel and directed by Naoto Hosoda, aired in Japan between October 4 and December 20, 2014. The scripts are written by Sadayuki Murai, Tatsuya Takahashi, and Satoko Shinozuka, and the series composition is by Rie Kawamata. The music is composed by Fūga Hatori, and Satoshi Motoyama serves as the sound director. The anime has been licensed for streaming in North America by Funimation, and in Southeast Asia by Muse Communication. There is a French sentence, "Nous dépassons beaucoup d'aujourd'hui, et changerons le destin quelque jour" (literally translated as "We pass many today, and change the destiny someday", and interpreted as "We pass by much today, and someday will change our fate"), at the bottom of the anime's title logo.

Music
The visual novel In Search of the Lost Future has three theme songs sung by Miyuki Hashimoto: the opening theme , the insert song "Ray of Memories", and the ending theme "Salut.soleil!" ("Bye! Sun."). A single containing all three songs was released by Lantis on October 27, 2010.

Both singles were released on October 22, 2014.

Reception
From September to November 2010, In Search of the Lost Future ranked twice in the top ten in national PC game pre-orders in Japan. The rankings were at No. 3 from September to October, and No. 1 from October to November. In Search of the Lost Future ranked first in terms of national sales of PC games in Japan in November 2010. The game ranked twice more at No. 43 for both December 2010 and February 2011.

References

External links
 at Trumple 
 

In Search of the Lost Future at Funimation

2010 video games
2011 manga
Anime television series based on video games
Bishōjo games
Drama anime and manga
Eroge
Feel (animation studio)
Funimation
Japan-exclusive video games
Kadokawa Shoten manga
Manga based on video games
Media Factory manga
Anime and manga about parallel universes
Romance anime and manga
School life in anime and manga
Science fiction anime and manga
Time loop anime and manga
Seinen manga
Video games developed in Japan
Visual novels
Windows games
Windows-only games
Muse Communication